Vic Aanensen (born 16 January 1953) is a former Australian rules footballer who played with South Melbourne in the Victorian Football League (VFL) and Port Melbourne in the Victorian Football Association (VFA) during the 1970s and 1980s.

A ruckman, Aanensen started his career with Port Melbourne in 1970. He was picked up by South Melbourne in the VFL for the 1973 season and went on to play 40 games for the club before returning to Port Melbourne without a clearance. He played a total of 129 for Port Melbourne in his two stints at the club. He won the J. J. Liston Trophy twice in his VFA career, in 1979 and 1981, and was a three time best and fairest winner and three time premiership player for Port Melbourne. In 2003 he was chosen as the second ruckman in Port's official 'Team of the Century'.

References

External links

1953 births
Living people
Australian rules footballers from Victoria (Australia)
Sydney Swans players
Port Melbourne Football Club players
J. J. Liston Trophy winners